is a train station located in Chikushino, Fukuoka.

Lines 

Nishi-Nippon Railroad
Tenjin Ōmuta Line

Platforms

Nishi-Nippon Railroad

Adjacent stations 

|-
|colspan=5 style="text-align:center;" |Nishi-Nippon Railroad

References

Railway stations in Fukuoka Prefecture
Railway stations in Japan opened in 1924